Piseinotecidae is a taxonomic family of sea slugs, specifically aeolid nudibranchs, marine gastropod molluscs in the superfamily Aeolidioidea. Recent studies suggest that the family might need to be merged with Flabellinidae.

Genera
Genera within the family Piseinotecidae include:
 Piseinotecus Er. Marcus, 1955

References

 
Aeolidioidea